The following species in the grass genus Digitaria, the finger-grasses, are accepted by Plants of the World Online. The genus contains the weedy crabgrasses and the orphan crops white fonio and black fonio.

List

Digitaria abludens 
Digitaria abyssinica 
Digitaria acuminatissima 
Digitaria adamaouensis 
Digitaria aequiglumis 
Digitaria albescens 
Digitaria alleizettei 
Digitaria ammophila 
Digitaria andicola 
Digitaria andringitrensis 
Digitaria angolensis 
Digitaria ankaratrensis 
Digitaria appropinquata 
Digitaria arenicola 
Digitaria argillacea 
Digitaria argyrograpta 
Digitaria argyrotricha 
Digitaria aridicola 
Digitaria aristulata 
Digitaria arushae 
Digitaria asthenes 
Digitaria atra 
Digitaria atrofusca 
Digitaria badia 
Digitaria baileyi 
Digitaria bakeri 
Digitaria balansae 
Digitaria barbinodis 
Digitaria basaltica 
Digitaria bicornis 
Digitaria bidactyla 
Digitaria bonplandii 
Digitaria bosseri 
Digitaria brazzae 
Digitaria breedlovei 
Digitaria breviglumis 
Digitaria brownii 
Digitaria brunoana 
Digitaria calcarata 
Digitaria caledonica 
Digitaria californica 
Digitaria cardenasiana 
Digitaria catamarcensis 
Digitaria cayoensis 
Digitaria chacoensis 
Digitaria chaseae 
Digitaria ciliaris 
Digitaria clarkiae 
Digitaria clavitricha 
Digitaria coenicola 
Digitaria cognata 
Digitaria comifera 
Digitaria compacta 
Digitaria complanata 
Digitaria compressa 
Digitaria connivens 
Digitaria corynotricha 
Digitaria costaricensis 
Digitaria cowiei 
Digitaria cruciata 
Digitaria ctenantha 
Digitaria curtigluma 
Digitaria curvinervis 
Digitaria cuyabensis 
Digitaria debilis 
Digitaria delicata 
Digitaria delicatula 
Digitaria diagonalis 
Digitaria didactyla 
Digitaria diffusa 
Digitaria dioica 
Digitaria distans 
Digitaria divaricatissima 
Digitaria diversinervis 
Digitaria doellii 
Digitaria dolleryi 
Digitaria dunensis 
Digitaria duthieana 
Digitaria eggersii 
Digitaria ekmanii 
Digitaria eminens 
Digitaria enodis 
Digitaria eriantha 
Digitaria eriostachya 
Digitaria evrardii 
Digitaria exilis 
Digitaria eylesii 
Digitaria fauriei 
Digitaria fiebrigii 
Digitaria filiformis 
Digitaria flaccida 
Digitaria floridana 
Digitaria fragilis 
Digitaria fujianensis 
Digitaria fulva 
Digitaria fuscescens 
Digitaria fuscopilosa 
Digitaria gardneri 
Digitaria gaudichaudii 
Digitaria gayana 
Digitaria gazensis 
Digitaria gentilis 
Digitaria gerdesii 
Digitaria gibbosa 
Digitaria glauca 
Digitaria gracillima 
Digitaria griffithii 
Digitaria gymnostachys 
Digitaria gymnotheca 
Digitaria hengduanensis 
Digitaria henrardii 
Digitaria heterantha 
Digitaria hitchcockii 
Digitaria hololeuca 
Digitaria horizontalis 
Digitaria hubbardii 
Digitaria humbertii 
Digitaria hyalina 
Digitaria hydrophila 
Digitaria hystrichoides 
Digitaria iburua 
Digitaria imbricata 
Digitaria incisa 
Digitaria induta 
Digitaria insularis 
Digitaria intecta 
Digitaria isanensis 
Digitaria ischaemum 
Digitaria jansenii 
Digitaria jubata 
Digitaria junghuhniana 
Digitaria killeenii 
Digitaria lanceolata 
Digitaria lanuginosa 
Digitaria larsenii 
Digitaria laxa 
Digitaria lehmanniana 
Digitaria leiantha 
Digitaria leptalea 
Digitaria leptorhachis 
Digitaria leucites 
Digitaria leucostachya 
Digitaria longiflora 
Digitaria macroblephara 
Digitaria madagascariensis 
Digitaria maitlandii 
Digitaria maniculata 
Digitaria manongarivensis 
Digitaria mariannensis 
Digitaria mauritiana 
Digitaria megasthenes 
Digitaria melanotricha 
Digitaria mezii 
Digitaria michoacanensis 
Digitaria milanjiana 
Digitaria minima 
Digitaria minoriflora 
Digitaria mollicoma 
Digitaria monobotrys 
Digitaria monodactyla 
Digitaria monodii 
Digitaria monopholis 
Digitaria montana 
Digitaria multiflora 
Digitaria myriostachya 
Digitaria myurus 
Digitaria natalensis 
Digitaria neesiana 
Digitaria neghellensis 
Digitaria nematostachya 
Digitaria nodosa 
Digitaria nuda 
Digitaria oraria 
Digitaria orbata 
Digitaria pampinosa 
Digitaria panicea 
Digitaria paniculata 
Digitaria papposa 
Digitaria paraguayensis 
Digitaria parodii 
Digitaria parva 
Digitaria parviflora 
Digitaria patagiata 
Digitaria patens 
Digitaria pauciflora 
Digitaria pearsonii 
Digitaria pellita 
Digitaria pennata 
Digitaria perpusilla 
Digitaria perrieri 
Digitaria perrottetii 
Digitaria petelotii 
Digitaria phaeothrix 
Digitaria phaeotricha 
Digitaria philippinensis 
Digitaria pinetorum 
Digitaria pittieri 
Digitaria planiculmis 
Digitaria platycarpha 
Digitaria poggeana 
Digitaria polybotryoides 
Digitaria polyphylla 
Digitaria porrecta 
Digitaria procurrens 
Digitaria psammophila 
Digitaria pseudodiagonalis 
Digitaria pubiflora 
Digitaria pulchra 
Digitaria purpurea 
Digitaria pusilla 
Digitaria radicosa 
Digitaria ramularis 
Digitaria rangelii 
Digitaria redheadii 
Digitaria remotigluma 
Digitaria rivae 
Digitaria rukwae 
Digitaria sabulicola 
Digitaria sacchariflora 
Digitaria sacculata 
Digitaria sanguinalis 
Digitaria schmitzii 
Digitaria sejuncta 
Digitaria sellowii 
Digitaria seriata 
Digitaria serotina 
Digitaria setifolia 
Digitaria setigera 
Digitaria sharpeana 
Digitaria siderograpta 
Digitaria simpsonii 
Digitaria singularis 
Digitaria sparsifructus 
Digitaria stenostachya 
Digitaria stenotaphrodes 
Digitaria stewartiana 
Digitaria stricta 
Digitaria subcalva 
Digitaria subsulcata 
Digitaria swalleniana 
Digitaria tararensis 
Digitaria tenuifolia 
Digitaria tenuis 
Digitaria ternata 
Digitaria texana 
Digitaria thailandica 
Digitaria thouarsiana 
Digitaria thwaitesii 
Digitaria thyrsoidea 
Digitaria tisserantii 
Digitaria tomentosa 
Digitaria tricholaenoides 
Digitaria trinervis 
Digitaria ursulae 
Digitaria veldkampiana 
Digitaria velutina 
Digitaria venezuelae 
Digitaria ventriosa 
Digitaria villiculmis 
Digitaria villosa 
Digitaria violascens 
Digitaria wallichiana 
Digitaria xanthotricha

References

Digitaria